Billy Harris (born ) is a professional rugby league footballer who played in the 2010s.

References

External links
Stanley Rangers ARLFC - Roll of Honour
 

1992 births
Living people
Castleford Tigers players
Dewsbury Rams players
English rugby league players
Place of birth missing (living people)
Rugby league second-rows